Stanko Bubalo (born 26 April 1973 in Široki Brijeg) is a Croatian retired footballer who played as a striker.

International career
He made two appearances for the Croatia national football team, making his debut against Mexico in a friendly game on 16 June 1999 and playing his final international in a May 2000 friendly against France.

References

External links
 
 Stanko Bubalo at the Croatian Football Federation

1973 births
Living people
People from Široki Brijeg
Bosnia and Herzegovina emigrants to Croatia
Croats of Bosnia and Herzegovina
Association football forwards
Croatian footballers
Croatia international footballers
NK Široki Brijeg players
NK Osijek players
HNK Hajduk Split players
FC Kärnten players
HŠK Posušje players
Premier League of Bosnia and Herzegovina players
Croatian Football League players
Austrian Football Bundesliga players
2. Liga (Austria) players
First League of the Federation of Bosnia and Herzegovina players
Croatian expatriate footballers
Expatriate footballers in Austria
Croatian expatriate sportspeople in Austria